The Ulster Emblem variety of potato originated in Northern Ireland. It was originally bred by Mr J. Clarke of Ballymoney, Co. Antrim.  It has a long oval shape with white skin and flesh which has a semiwaxy texture, reasonable flavour with good cooking quality, and a fairly good yield. This variety has a red violet coloured flower and a pink sprout colour. It also has a high resistance to late blight on the tubers as well as the plant foliage.

References 

Potato cultivars